Dashlane is a subscription-based password manager and digital wallet application available on macOS, Windows, iOS and Android. Dashlane uses a freemium pricing model with subscription plan option.

Overview 
Dashlane was founded on July 6, 2009, releasing their first software on May 23, 2012, that first included a password manager (encrypted using AES-256), which was walled behind a single master password. Over time, more features were introduced to the product such as:

 Multi-factor authentication
 Automatic form filling
 Password generation
 Digital wallet
 Security breach alert
 Virtual private network

Source code 
The source code for the Android and the iOS app are available under the Creative Commons NonCommercial license 4.0.

See also
 List of password managers
 Cryptography

References

External links 
 
 

Password managers
Cryptographic software
Nonfree unsigned Firefox WebExtensions
Internet Explorer add-ons
Google Chrome extensions
2012 software